Warngau is a municipality in the Miesbach District of Bavaria, Germany.

Warngau has a railway station on the line from Munich to Lenggries with services operated by Bayerische Oberlandbahn (BOB). The railway near Warngau was the scene of a serious accident in 1975.

References

Miesbach (district)